Ireland is scheduled to compete at the 2024 Summer Olympics in Paris from 26 July to 11 August 2024, commemorating its centenary of the team's debut as an independent country in the same venue. Irish athletes have competed in every Summer Olympics edition of the modern era, either in its own right or as part of a Great Britain and Ireland team before 1924, except for the Nazi-ruled Berlin 1936.

Competitors
The following is the list of number of competitors in the Games. Note that reserves in field hockey, football, and handball are not counted:

Equestrian

Ireland entered a full squad of equestrian riders each to the team eventing and jumping competitions through a top-five finish in jumping at the 2022 FEI World Championships in Herning, Denmark, and through a top-six finish at the Eventing Worlds on the same year in Pratoni del Vivaro, Italy.

Eventing

Jumping

References

Nations at the 2024 Summer Olympics
2024
2024 in Irish sport